André Saint-Mleux (25 September 1920 – 7 October 2012) was a Minister of State for Monaco. He was in office from 1972 to 1981. During this time he represented Monaco at the Conference on Security and Co-operation in Europe.

References

1920 births
2012 deaths
Politicians from Saint-Malo
Ministers of State of Monaco